The Michiganensian, also known as the Ensian, is the official yearbook of the University of Michigan. Its first issue was published in April 1896, as a consolidation of three campus publications, The Res Gestae, the Palladium, and the Castalian. The yearbook is editorially and financially independent of the University of Michigan's administration and other student groups, but it shares the Stanford Lipsey Student Publications Building on 420 Maynard Street with The Michigan Daily and Gargoyle Humor Magazine.

The Michiganensian is published yearly in late spring by a staff of several dozen students. The book is the second oldest publication on campus, and it contains articles and original photography related to campus life, student activism, university athletics, and current events.

History
Three annual publications with directories consolidated to form the Michiganensian in 1896; The Res Gestae, which was law- and academic-focused, the Palladium, which was literary with a focus on secret societies, and the Castalian, which was literary-focused. Although the name Michiganensian remains a mystery, some believe it may come from the word ensign.

Some editions of the Michiganensian as recently as the 1980s include articles about and the published names of members of the controversial secret society Michigamua. There have also been Michiganensian editors who have been Michigamua members. 

In its earliest form, the Michiganensian served as a illustrated directory, providing information on organizations, fraternities, and athletics. As the publication evolved in the early 1900s, more space was dedicated to writing and photographs, but the publication still focused largely on fraternities and athletics. Now, in its current form, the Michiganensian is composed of photography and stories about campus life, student activism, current events, and athletics. 

In 1954 and 1957, the Michiganensian created vinyl records titled "Michiganensian Presents: Memories in Sound" which contained audio summaries of each year and were innovative for their time. 

The 2021 Michiganensian included a statement from the editorial board criticizing the University of Michigan administration and President Mark Schlissel for their handling of the COVID-19 pandemic and standing in solidarity with marginalized populations and student activists on campus in the wake of the George Floyd protests. The 2021 book's cover did not include the University of Michigan's signature maize and blue colors. The 125th issue also split with precedent by including limited fraternity and sorority coverage, amid student criticism of secret societies on campus and a nationwide 'Abolish Greek Life' movement.

Notable alumni 

 Margaret Bourke-White, Photographer
Stanford Lipsey, Photo Editor
Jay Cassidy, Photographer

Editorial boards

Awards 
 2020-2021 College Media Association Pinnacle Awards, Best Yearbook News Page/Spread, Third Place 
 2020-2021 College Media Association Pinnacle Awards, Best Yearbook Entertainment Page/Spread, Third Place 
 2020-2021 College Media Association Pinnacle Awards, Best Yearbook Feature Page/Spread, Honorable Mention 
 2019-2020 College Media Association Pinnacle Awards, Best Yearbook Division Page/Spread, Third Place
 2018-2019 College Media Association Pinnacle Awards, Best Yearbook Cover Design, Third Place
2017 Associated Collegiate Press, Best of Show Award, Tenth Place
2015 Associated Collegiate Press, Best of Show Award, Eighth Place
2015 Herff Jones Certificate of Achievement, Perfect Performer Meeting Yearbook Deadlines
2014 Associated Collegiate Press, Best of Show Award, Tenth Place
2014 Columbia Scholastic Press Association, Gold Medalist Award
2014 Associated Collegiate Press, Best of Show Award, Fifth Place
2014 Associated Collegiate Press, All-American Rating with Five Marks of Distinction
2013 Columbia Scholastic Press Association, Gold Medalist Award
2013 Associated Collegiate Press, All-American Rating with Four Marks of Distinction
2012 Associated Collegiate Press, Yearbook Pacemaker Finalist
2011 Jostens Gotcha Covered Look Book Feature
2009 Associated Collegiate Press, Design of the Year Award, Second Place
2003 Associated Collegiate Press, Yearbook Pacemaker Finalist
2003 Columbia Scholastic Press Association, College Silver Crown Yearbook
2003 Jostens Gotcha Covered Look Book Feature
2002 Associated Collegiate Press, Best of Show, First Place
2002 Associated Collegiate Press, Yearbook Pacemaker Finalist
2002 Columbia Scholastic Press Association, College Gold Crown Yearbook
2003 Jostens Gotcha Covered Look Book Feature
2002 Printing Industries of America Premier Print Awards, Award of Recognition
2001 Associated Collegiate Press, Yearbook Pacemaker Winner
2001 Columbia Scholastic Press Association, Silver Medalist Certificate
2001 Jostens Gotcha Covered Look Book Feature
2001 Jostens National Yearbook Sample
2001 Printing Industries of America Premier Print Awards, Certificate of Merit
2000 Associated Collegiate Press, Yearbook Pacemaker Finalist
2000 Columbia Scholastic Press Association, Silver Medalist Certificate
1999 Columbia Scholastic Press Association, College Gold Crown Yearbook
1999 Columbia Scholastic Press Association, Silver Medalist Certificate
1999 Printing Industries of America Premier Print Awards, Award of Recognition
1998 Columbia Scholastic Press Association, College Gold Crown Yearbook
1998 Associated Collegiate Press, Yearbook Pacemaker Finalist
1998 Printing Industries of America Premier Print Awards, Certificate of Merit
1997 Columbia Scholastic Press Association, Gold Medalist Certificate
1996 Columbia Scholastic Press Association, Gold Medalist Certificate
1993 Columbia Scholastic Press Association, College Silver Crown Yearbook
1992 Columbia Scholastic Press Association, College Silver Crown Yearbook
1991 Associated Collegiate Press, First Class Merit with two Marks of Distinction
1991 Columbia Scholastic Press Association, Medalist Certificate
1990 Columbia Scholastic Press Association, First Place Certificate
1988 Columbia Scholastic Press Association, Second Place Certificate
1987 Associated Collegiate Press, First Class Merit with two Marks of Distinction
1986 Columbia Scholastic Press Association, First Place Certificate
1985 Associated Collegiate Press, First Class Merit with two Marks of Distinction
1985 Columbia Scholastic Press Association, First Place Certificate
1984 Columbia Scholastic Press Association, Certificate of Merit for Academic Spread (Ranjon O. Bose, pages 130-131)
1984 Columbia Scholastic Press Association, Certificate of Merit for Graphics (Bill Marsh, pages 30-31)
1983 Columbia Scholastic Press Association, First Place Certificate
1977 Columbia Scholastic Press Association, Second Place Certificate

Internal Awards

Outstanding Staff Member Award 
This award honors the exceptional work and contributions of a senior member who been on staff for two or more years.

Photographer of the Year

References

External links 

 https://michiganyearbook.com

Publications established in 1896
University of Michigan mass media
1896 establishments in Michigan
Mass media in Ann Arbor, Michigan
Yearbooks